The Sokol Pavilion, also known as Sokol Auditorium, is a building in Wilber, Nebraska that was built in 1930.  It was listed on the National Register of Historic Places on September 14, 1995. The building historically served as a host for Sokol gymnastic events and as a meeting hall for the Czech community.

See also 
 Sokol
 Sokol Auditorium

References

External links 
 Additional photos of Sokol Pavilion at Wikimedia Commons

Czech-American culture in Nebraska
Buildings and structures in Saline County, Nebraska
Clubhouses on the National Register of Historic Places in Nebraska
Sokol in the United States
Cultural infrastructure completed in 1930
National Register of Historic Places in Saline County, Nebraska
1930 establishments in Nebraska